"Only the Wind" is a song written by Tom Shapiro and Chuck Jones, and recorded by American country music artist Billy Dean. It was released in December 1991 as the second single from his album Billy Dean.  The song spent twenty weeks on the Hot Country Songs charts in 1992, peaking at number four.

Content
The song uses an analogy of a common childhood fear of a windstorm to frame a young man's failing relationship with a woman. Here, the protagonist recalls being comforted by his mother as a gusting, howling wind smacks the screen door and causes him to be frightened. The scene then shifts to the present, where he reveals his relationship difficulties and a fight that causes the woman to leave. Upon hearing the screen door slam shut, he remembers his childhood and wishes aloud that her leaving is just temporary ("It's only the wind, and nothing more/not the end of my world, walking out the door"), knowing that in this case, he has no one to comfort him.

Music video
The music video was directed by Bill Young and premiered in early 1992.

Chart positions

Year-end charts

References

1991 singles
Billy Dean songs
Songs written by Chuck Jones (songwriter)
Songs written by Tom Shapiro
Song recordings produced by Tom Shapiro
Capitol Records Nashville singles
1991 songs